La Parva is a town and ski resort located about  northeast of the Chilean capital of Santiago.  It is in the middle ridge of the "3 Valleys" resorts that also includes El Colorado and Valle Nevado.

References

External links
  official site

Ski areas and resorts in Chile
Sports venues in Santiago Metropolitan Region